
The surname Bruce is a surname of Scottish and French origins but also with several other origins. In Scotland, it is derived from Clan Bruce. In some cases it is derived from the French place name of Briouze in Orne, while in others it appears to be derived from Brix in Manche, or Bruz in Brittany, both in France.

The surname is also common among a Ghanaian family of Accra of Euro-African ancestry.

People with the surname
 Adam Bruce (born 1968), Scottish businessman
 Alexander Bruce (disambiguation)
 Alice Bruce (1867–1951), British educationist
 Andrew Bruce, 11th Earl of Elgin, Scottish aristocrat, chief of the name of Bruce
 Brenda Bruce (1918–1996), British actress
 Benjamin F. Bruce (1811–1888), New York politician
 Cameron Bruce (born 1979), Australian-football professional
 Carlos Bruce (born 1959), Peruvian politician
 Carol Bruce (1919–2007), American actress and singer
 Catherine Wolfe Bruce (1816–1900), American benefactor of the Harvard College Observatory
 Charles Bruce (disambiguation)
 Colin Bruce (disambiguation)
David Bruce (disambiguation), several people
 Earle Bruce (born 1931), American football coach
 Edgar Bruce (c. 1845–1901), English actor-manager
 Edward Bruce (c. 1275–1318), King of Ireland
 Edward Bruce, 1st Lord Kinloss, Scottish Judge
 F. F. Bruce (1910–1990), Scottish professor and Biblical scholar
 Fiona Bruce (born 1964), British television presenter
 Fiona Bruce (politician) (born 1957), British politician
 Frederick Bruce-Lyle (1953 – 2016), Ghanaian-born jurist and judge in several Caribbean countries
 William Bruce-Lyle (born 1919), Ghanaian jurist of Supreme Courts of Ghana and Zambia
 Frederick Nanka-Bruce (1878–1953), physician, journalist and politician of British Gold Coast colony
 Gail Bruce (1923–1998), American football player
 Geoffrey Bruce (mountaineer) (1896–1972), British army officer and Everest mountaineer
 George Bruce (disambiguation)
 Harriet Bruce-Annan (born 1965), Ghanaian programmer and humanitarian
 Ingrid Bruce (1940–2012), Swedish civil engineer
 Isaac Bruce (born 1972), American football wide receiver for the St. Louis Rams
 Jack Bruce (1943–2014), Scottish bass player with the band Cream
 Jacob Bruce (1669–1735), Russian statesman, military leader and scientist
 James Bruce (disambiguation)
 Jay Bruce (born 1987), Major League Baseball outfielder
 John Bruce (disambiguation)
 John Bruce-Gardyne Baron Bruce-Gardyne of Kirkden
 Joseph Bruce (born 1972), known as Violent J, American rapper of duo Insane Clown Posse
 Josette Bruce (1920–1996), French novelist
 Joshua Harrison Bruce (8133-1891), American farmer and politician
 Kate Bruce (1860–1946), American actress
 Ken Bruce (born 1951), radio presenter
 King Bruce, (1922–1997), Ghanaian composer, band leader and musician
 Lenny Bruce (1925–1966), American stand-up comedian, writer, social critic and satirist
 Lucinda Bruce-Gardyne, writer, entrepreneur and cookery expert
 Malcolm Bruce (born 1944), British politician
 Michael Bruce (disambiguation)
 Mrs Victor Bruce, British aviator, racing driver and businesswoman
 Nigel Bruce (1895–1953), British character actor
 Patrick Henry Bruce (1881–1936), American cubist painter
 Robert Bruce (disambiguation)
 Rowena Mary Bruce (1915–1999), English chess master
 Stanley Bruce (1883–1967), Prime Minister of Australia
 Steve Bruce (born 1960), British football manager
 Tammy Bruce (born 1962), American radio host, author, and political commentator
 Theo Bruce (1923–2002), Australian athlete
 Theodore Bruce (1847–1911), South Australian auctioneer, politician and mayor of Adelaide
 Thomas Bruce (disambiguation)
 Vicki Bruce (born 1953), British psychologist
 Victor Bruce, 9th Earl of Elgin, Viceroy of India
 Vida Bruce, Ghanaian athlete
 W. H. Bruce (fl.1910–1930), businessman in Adelaide, South Australia
 William Bruce (disambiguation)

Citations

References

English-language surnames
Scottish surnames